Dương Thu Hương (born 1947) is a Vietnamese author and political dissident.

Early life 

Born in 1947 in Thái Bình a province in northern Vietnam, Dương came of age just as the Vietnam War was turning violent. At the age of twenty, when she was a student at Vietnamese Ministry of Culture’s Arts College, Dương Thu Hương volunteered to serve in a women’s youth brigade on the front lines of "The War Against the Americans". Dương spent the next seven years of the war in the jungles and tunnels of Bình Trị Thiên, the most heavily bombarded region of the war. Her mission was to "sing louder than the bombs" and to give theatrical performances for the North Vietnamese troops, but also to tend to the wounded, bury the dead, and accompany the soldiers along. She was one of three survivors out of the forty volunteers in that group. She was also at the front during China’s attacks on Vietnam in 1979 during the short-lived Sino-Vietnamese War. 
However, in the period after Vietnam’s reunification in 1975, Dương became increasingly outspoken and critical about the repressive atmosphere created by the Communist government. Upon seeing the conditions in the South – compared with the North – she began speaking out against the communist government. She was expelled from the party in 1989, and has been denied the right to travel abroad, and was temporarily imprisoned for her writings and outspoken criticism of corruption in the Vietnamese government.

Writings 
Her first novels, Journey in Childhood (Hành trình ngày thơ ấu, 1985), Beyond Illusions (Bên kia bờ ảo vọng, 1987), Paradise of the Blind (Những thiên đường mù, 1988) and The Lost Life (Quãng đời đánh mất, 1989) were published in her native Vietnam and soon became bestsellers in Vietnam before they were banned. The third one was also the first Vietnamese novel ever published in the United States in English. Her next three books — Novel Without a Name (Tiểu thuyết vô đề, 1991), Memories of a Pure Spring (2000), and No Man's Land (Chốn vắng, 2002) — have not been published in the United States. She was made a Chevalier of the Ordre des Arts et des Lettres by the French government (1994). She earlier wrote a number of short stories and screenplays. One story, "Reflections of Spring," was translated by Linh Dinh and included in the anthology, Night, Again: Contemporary Fiction from Vietnam (Seven Stories Press 2006).
Her novel No Man's Land (Terre des oublis in French, which won the Grand prix des lectrices de Elle (2007)), was perhaps her most successful, it was in the final list of the prize Femina 2006 and received the Grand prix des lectrices de Elle in 2007.

Political fallout 

Dương has been labeled as a "dissident writer" and been expelled by Vietnam’s Communist party and was imprisoned for a short time in 1991 for remarks criticizing the goals and interests of the party and its members. This is not unusual in contemporary Vietnam; Linh Dinh, in his introduction to the collection Night, Again, details the government’s extreme response to certain subjects in writing – for example, in 1956, the poet Tran Dan was arrested for capitalizing "He" in a brief passage of a poem cataloging social despair, since such a designation was reserved for Ho Chi Minh. In 1991, Le Minh Khue was still criticized for having a North Vietnamese female soldier daydream about the smile of a handsome South Vietnamese prisoner of war.

Though she was one of Vietnam’s most popular writers, most of her fiction is published outside of Vietnam due to both the censorship and the government’s monopoly of the publishing industry.

Recently, she has retired and earns a pension of approximately twenty U.S. dollars per month and must earn her living working as a translator and trying to publish her novels and short stories abroad. She believes in struggling to gain democracy; while unable to run for political office or organize a competing party, she now uses writing in order to articulate that message.

In her story "The Story of an Actress," Dương combines her passionate beliefs about human freedom with her existentialist literary sensibilities. Bê and Thom live next door to one another and become best friends; while Bê is intelligent and fun-loving, Thom develops into the town beauty. Thom ends up marrying the most famous theater director in Vietnam, a man 40 years her senior, in an attempt to become an actress; Bê visits her and watches her life disintegrate as she works toward her degree and her own life dream.

On the surface, it seems to be a relatively simple story about two girls growing up and choosing different paths in life. But her language and details betray, as with Ho Xuan Huong, a deeper level to a simple story. She is critiquing a contemporary society where beauty is prized over intellect and money over kindness, and calling attention to how the optimism of youth, when it fades, can be so devastating that it drives people to despair.

According to Dương, most writers must learn how to voice their individual concerns within a group mentality. In other words, their writing must reflect the individual and the masses at large in a way that's approved by the party; Dương finds that most writers in contemporary Vietnam get caught up in the group thinking mentality.

Dương has felt the effects of censorship perhaps more cruelly than many of her fellow writers. Her work is not contained in any Vietnamese anthologies or collections. Though she has achieved success and renown abroad for her novels through translation, the audience she is writing for in Vietnam, that would most understand the minutiae of her stories, does not often have the opportunity to read her work, except when it is smuggled into Vietnam.

Nevertheless, Dương is hopeful for the future of writing in her country. She is counting on the fact that at some point, the people will open their eyes to see what's going on in her homeland.

Dương moved to Paris in 2006. In January 2009, her latest novel, Đỉnh Cao Chói Lọi, was published; it was also translated into French as Au zénith.

Awards and honors

2001: Prince Claus Award
2005: Oxfam Novib/PEN Award
 2007: Grand prix des lectrices de Elle

List of works translated into English

 Beyond Illusions (1987)
Paradise of the Blind (1988)
 Novel Without A Name (1995)
 Memories of a Pure Spring (1996)
 No Man's Land (2002)
 The Zenith (2009)

References

External links 
Review of No Man's Land in January magazine
Duong Thu Huong /Banned Books
A discourse shaped by the Vietnam War Dương Thu Hương in France By Alan Riding(International Herald Tribune Published: FRIDAY, JULY 15, 2005)
Dương Thu Hương entry on Wikivietlit
Beyond Illusions, translated from Bên kia bờ ảo vọng
Novel without a Name, translated from Tiểu thuyết vô đề
 Review of Memories of a Pure Spring 

1947 births
Living people
Vietnamese novelists
Vietnamese women writers
Vietnamese dissidents
People from Thái Bình province
North Vietnamese military personnel of the Vietnam War
Chevaliers of the Ordre des Arts et des Lettres
Communist Party of Vietnam politicians
20th-century Vietnamese women politicians
20th-century Vietnamese politicians
French people of Vietnamese descent
Women in war in Vietnam
Women in warfare post-1945
Women novelists
Communist women writers
Fiction about the People's Liberation Army